Darin "Woody" Eblom is a game designer who has worked primarily on role-playing games.

Career
Darin "Woody" Eblom was one of the Minnesota locals who joined Lion Rampant after the company was started. Eblom and John Nephew left Lion Rampant in 1990 when the company moved to Georgia as they did not want to leave Minnesota. John Nephew founded Atlas Games with some help from other Lion Rampant alumni such as Nicole Lindroos and Eblom. After the success of On the Edge (1994), Eblom became one of the new full-time employees of Atlas Games. Eblom formed Tundra Sales, a sales and service organization for small press RPG publishers.

References

External links
 

Atlas Games people
Living people
Role-playing game designers
Year of birth missing (living people)